The Lorraine-Hanriot LH.60 was a training monoplane built in France in the early 1930s.

Design
It was a conventional parasol-wing monoplane with fixed tailskid undercarriage, the main units of which were mounted on outriggers attached to the wing struts. The pilot and instructor sat in tandem open cockpits. The LH.60 was of wood and metal construction.

Variants
LH.60Parasol monoplane crew / observer trainer
LH.61Parasol monoplane fighter trainer

Specifications (LH.60)

References

1930s French military trainer aircraft
L.060
Parasol-wing aircraft
Aircraft first flown in 1931